Lalla Laaroussa is an annual Moroccan television game show produced by the SNRT and broadcast on Al Aoula every Saturday evening (rebroadcast on Sunday afternoon) each prime-time of the show includes summaries, competitions, challenges. The idea is to involve newlyweds in order to win a dream home, a wedding party organized in Marrakech, as well as a honeymoon in Thailand, the others who do not reach the final win Also checks or home appliances.

The winners 
 Season 2006: Bouchra and Karim from Larache.
 Season 2007: Fatima Al-Zahra and Naeem from Essaouira.
 Season 2008: Kawthar and Radwan from Laayoune.
 Season 2009: Widad and Yassin from Marrakech.
 Season 2010: Widad and Sultan from Meknes.
 Season 2011: Asma and Anwar from Zagora.
 Season 2012: Khadija and Zakaria from Agadir.
 Season 2014: Inssaf and Yassin from the city of Tangier.
 Season 2015: Aziza and Marwan from Casablanca.
 Season 2016: Hassnaa and Ayub from El Jadida.
 Season 2017: Nesreen and Monaam from Tan-Tan

Hosts 
 2006: Najat El Ouafi and Abdallah Didan (actors)
 2007-2008: Rachid El Ouali (actor) Rachid El Idrissi
 2009: Khadija Assad and Aziz Saadlah (actors and married in real life)
 2010: Fatine El Yousr, Ibtissam Koutaibi and Younes Belasri
 2011: Fatine El Yousr, Ibtissam Koutaibi and Younes Belasri
 2012: Fatima Khair and Azzedine Tsouli (actors and married in real life)
 2014: Fatima Khair and Abdessamad Miftah El Kheir (actors)
 2015: Fatima Khair and Abdessamad Miftah El Kheir (actors)
 2016: Fatima Khair and Abdessamad Miftah El Kheir (actors)
 2017: Fatima Khair and Abdessamad Miftah El Kheir (actors)

External links 
 Official website
 Website of Lalla Laaroussa on the channel

References

2006 Moroccan television series debuts
Television in Morocco
Moroccan television series